Newton is a locality, farm and former feudal barony, in the parish of Forgan,  south of Wormit in Fife, Scotland.

History
Newton was held by the Lacelles family until the estate passed by the marriage of Marjorie Lascelles to Richard de Moravia in the 13th century. The estate passed by marriage of the heiress Gyles Murray to Thomas Kinnaird, in the 15th century.

References

Baronies in the Baronage of Scotland